Erik Bork is a screenwriter, producer, script consultant and blogger best known for his work on the HBO miniseries Band of Brothers and From the Earth to the Moon, for which he wrote multiple episodes, and won two Emmy and two Golden Globe Awards as part of the producing team.

Background
Bork got his start in Hollywood as an assistant to Tom Hanks, who gave him the opportunity to help write and produce From the Earth to the Moon, after reading some sitcom spec scripts he had written.

Career
Bork has sold series pitches (and written pilots) at NBC and FOX, worked on the writing staff for two primetime dramas, and written feature screenplays on assignment for companies including Universal Studios, HBO, TNT, and Playtone.

Bork also teaches screenwriting for UCLA Extension Writers' Program, National University and The Writers Store, and offers one-on-one consulting to writers. His blog was named one of the top 10 most influential screenwriting blogs in 2013.

References

External links

Living people
American educators
Screenwriters from Ohio
American male screenwriters
American television writers
American male television writers
21st-century American male writers
Screenwriting instructors
Year of birth missing (living people)
21st-century American screenwriters